16S rRNA (adenine1408-N1)-methyltransferase (kanamycin-apramycin resistance methylase, 16S rRNA:m1A1408 methyltransferase, KamB, NpmA, 16S rRNA m1A1408 methyltransferase) is an enzyme with systematic name S-adenosyl-L-methionine:16S rRNA (adenine1408-N1)-methyltransferase. This enzyme catalyses the following chemical reaction

 S-adenosyl-L-methionine + adenine1408 in 16S rRNA  S-adenosyl-L-homocysteine + N1-methyladenine1408 in 16S rRNA

The enzyme provides a  resistance through interference with the binding of aminoglycosides.

References

External links 
 

EC 2.1.1